Rossese is the name of several Italian wine grape variety including:

Rossese di Dolceacqua, red wine grape that is also known as Tibouren in the French wine region of Provence. Rossese di Dolceacqua is an Italian DOP wine
Rossese di Campochiesa, red wine grape that is primarily found in the province of Savona in Liguria
Rossese bianco, white wine grape that is primarily found in the province of Cuneo in Piedmont
Rossese bianco di San Biagio, white wine grape that is primarily found in the province of Savona in Liguria
Rossese bianco di Monforte, white wine grape that is primarily found in the province of Cuneo in Piedmont
Ruzzese, white wine grape that is also known as Rossese bianco in the province of La Spezia in Liguria
Grillo, white wine grape that is also known as Rossese bianco in the province of La Spezia in Liguria